Wijeratne is a Sinhalese name that may refer to
Given name
 Wijeratne Warakagoda, Sri Lankan actor 

Surname
 Dinuk Wijeratne, Sri Lankan-born Canadian conductor, composer and pianist 
 Larry Wijeratne (1950–1998), Sri Lankan general
 Ranjan Wijeratne (1931–1991), Sri Lankan minister 
 Sahan Wijeratne (born 1984), Sri Lankan cricketer
 Srimantha Wijeratne (born 1989), Canadian cricketer 
 Vishva Wijeratne (born 1992), Sri Lankan cricketer 

Sinhalese masculine given names
Sinhalese surnames